Wisk'achani (Aymara wisk'acha a rodent, -ni a suffix to indicate ownership, "the one with the viscacha", Hispanicized spelling Viscachani) is a  mountain in the Bolivian Andes. It is located in the La Paz Department, Inquisivi Province, Ichoca Municipality, and in the Loayza Province, Yaco Municipality. Wisk'achani is situated south-east of Caxata.

References 

Mountains of La Paz Department (Bolivia)